Aïn Tédelès is a town and commune in Mostaganem Province, Algeria. It is the capital of Aïn Tédelès District. According to the 1998 census it has a population of 31,685.

References

Communes of Mostaganem Province